Vedii Tosuncuk (1921 – 10 May 2011) was a Turkish footballer. He competed in the men's tournament at the 1948 Summer Olympics.

Individual
Beşiktaş J.K. Squads of Century (Silver Team)

References

External links
 

1921 births
2011 deaths
Turkish footballers
Turkey international footballers
Olympic footballers of Turkey
Footballers at the 1948 Summer Olympics
Footballers from Istanbul
Association football defenders